Harpster is an unincorporated community in Idaho County, Idaho, United States. Harpster is located along Idaho State Highway 13 northeast of Grangeville and south of Stites.

History
Harpster's population was 135 in 1909.

References

Unincorporated communities in Idaho County, Idaho
Unincorporated communities in Idaho